Chaleur humaine (English: Human Warmth, retitled Christine and the Queens in some English-speaking territories) is the debut studio album by French singer Christine and the Queens. The album was re-released in 2015 with new songs and "Tilted" – the English version of "Christine" – served as a single.

Background
The album was first released in France as Chaleur humaine in June 2014. The album was released in United States on 16 October 2015 via Because Music as Christine and the Queens. For its American release, many the tracks were reworked with English lyrics and revamped beats by producer Ash Workman. Two tracks were replaced with three new songs. Two of the new songs are collaborations – "Jonathan" with Perfume Genius, and "No Harm Is Done" with rapper Tunji Ige.  The American version was released in the UK in 2016 but reverted to its original French title.

Composition
On his verified Genius account, Letissier offers some insight on how some tracks were conceived. He describes the whole album as "a dream about adolescence" "Christine"/"Tilted" is about "trying to embrace this weirdness, awkwardness of yours, all those thoughts and details that make you feel like you don't belong." 
"Saint Claude" is written in a stream of consciousness style, inspired by rappers like Kendrick Lamar that Letissier was listening to at the time. 
"Science Fiction" is about a Seapunk girl named Stella "galaxy shorts" and the song is described as an LSD daydream about her. The lyric "paper cut humanoids" is a direct allusion to the animated series The Wild Planet. Letissier describes it as an italo disco inspired by Lovemachine by Supermax. 
The percussion on "Here" was inspired by Phil Collins' "In the Air Tonight". 
"Ugly-Pretty" takes inspiration "from certain harmonic sequences specific to operas and pieces of classical music" as well as Klaus Nomi and House music and the title itself was taken from Letissier watching American reality television programs like America's Next Top Model. The bridge features lyrics in French that refer to pornography and the idea of abstract sex not connected to emotions, and the theme of ugliness vs attractiveness at the same time.

Critical reception

The album has been given a Metacritic rating of 85 based on 11 reviews, indicating "universal acclaim". The album is featured on many end of year lists, including Rough Trade and NME.

Accolades

Commercial performance
The album first entered the French chart at No. 6 on its release in June 2014, and peaked at No. 2 in February 2015. As of April 2018, the album had sold 650,000 units in this country. It also reached No. 1 on the Belgian Wallonia albums chart.

The English version of the album was released in the UK on 26 February 2016, and first entered the UK Albums Chart at No. 132 the following week. It then re-entered at No. 8 in June 2016, just prior to Christine and the Queens performing a well-received concert at the Glastonbury Festival. It peaked at No. 2 on 29 July 2016. As of April 2018, the album had sold 220,000 units in the UK. The album debuted at No. 3 on the Irish Albums Chart in June 2016, before reaching No. 1 on 21 July 2016.

In 2016 it was awarded a platinum certification from the Independent Music Companies Association, which indicated sales of at least 400,000 copies+ throughout Europe.

As of January 2017 the record has sold 970,000 copies worldwide, in addition to attracting more than 194m streams – an ‘album equivalent’ streaming figure in most territories of 129,000.

Track listing

Charts

Weekly charts

Year-end charts

|-

|-

|-

|-

|-

|-

|-

|-

|-

|-

|-

|-
! scope="row"| Belgian Albums (Ultratop Flanders)
| 95
|-
! scope="row"| Belgian Albums (Ultratop Wallonia)
| 58
|-
! scope="row"| UK Albums (OCC)
| 33
|-

Certifications

References

2014 debut albums
Christine and the Queens albums
Because Music albums
Alternative R&B albums
European Border Breakers Award-winning albums
Indie pop albums by French artists
Chillwave albums
Synth-pop albums
Experimental pop albums